St Patrick's GAA is a Gaelic Athletic Association club in the parish of Drangan and Cloneen in County Tipperary, Ireland. The club are part of the South Tipperary GAA division.

Achievements
 Munster Junior Club Hurling Championship Runners-Up 2010
 Tipperary Senior Football Championship Winners 1947, 1953
 South Tipperary Senior Football Championship Winners 1947, 1953, 1990 (with Grangemockler)
 South Tipperary Intermediate Football Championship Winners 1995
 Tipperary Junior A Football Championship Winners 1967, 1991 
 South Tipperary Junior Hurling Championship Winners 1991, 2005, 2010, 2014, 2015
 South Tipperary Under-21 Football Championship Winners 1970 (with Mullinahone as Slievenamon)
 Tipperary Under-21 C Football Championship Winners 2012
 South Tipperary Under-21 C Football Championship Winners 2003, 2012
 South Tipperary Under-21 B Hurling Championship Winners 2004, 2009
 South Tipperary Under-21 C Hurling Championship Winners 2001
 Tipperary Minor Football Championship Winners 1970 (with Mullinahone as Slievenamon) 
 South Tipperary Minor Football Championship Winners 1970 (with Mullinahone as Slievenamon)
 South Tipperary Minor B Football Championship Winners 2005 (as St. Patrick's Gaels)
 Tipperary Minor C Football Championship Winners 2001
 South Tipperary Minor C Football Championship Winners 2001
 South Tipperary Minor B Hurling Championship Winners 2003
 South Tipperary Minor C Hurling Championship Winners 1999, 2002

References

External links 
Official Site
Tipperary GAA site

Gaelic games clubs in County Tipperary